Sophos Group plc is a British based security software and hardware company. Sophos develops products for communication endpoint, encryption, network security, email security, mobile security and unified threat management. Sophos is primarily focused on providing security software to 1- to 5,000-seat organizations. While not a primary focus, Sophos also protects home users, through free and paid antivirus solutions (Sophos Home/Home Premium) intended to demonstrate product functionality. It was listed on the London Stock Exchange until it was acquired by Thoma Bravo in February 2020.

History 
Sophos was founded by Jan Hruska and Peter Lammer and began producing its first antivirus and encryption products in 1985. During the late 1980s and into the 1990s, Sophos primarily developed and sold a range of security technologies in the UK, including encryption tools available for most users (private or business). In the late 1990s, Sophos concentrated its efforts on the development and sale of antivirus technology, and embarked on a program of international expansion.

In 2003, Sophos acquired ActiveState, a Canadian software company that developed anti-spam software. At that time viruses were being spread primarily through email spam and this allowed Sophos to produce a combined anti-spam and antivirus solution. In 2006, Peter Gyenes and Steve Munford were named chairman and CEO of Sophos, respectively. Jan Hruska and Peter Lammer remained as members of the board of directors. In 2010, the majority interest of Sophos was sold to Apax. In 2010, Nick Bray, formerly Group CFO at Micro Focus International, was named CFO of Sophos.

In 2011, Utimaco Safeware AG (acquired by Sophos in 2008–9) were accused of supplying data monitoring and tracking software to partners that have sold to governments such as Syria: Sophos issued a statement of apology and confirmed that they had suspended their relationship with the partners in question and launched an investigation. In 2012, Kris Hagerman, formerly CEO at Corel Corporation, was named CEO of Sophos and joined the company's board. Former CEO Steve Munford became non-executive chairman of the board. In February 2014, Sophos announced that it had acquired Cyberoam Technologies, a provider of network security products. In June 2015, Sophos announced plans to raise US$100 million on the London Stock Exchange. Sophos was floated on the FTSE in September 2015.

On 14 October 2019, Sophos announced that Thoma Bravo, a US-based private equity firm, made an offer to acquire Sophos for US$7.40 per share, representing an enterprise value of approximately US$3.9 billion. The board of directors of Sophos stated their intention to unanimously recommend the offer to the company's shareholders. On 2 March 2020 Sophos announced the completion of the acquisition.

Acquisitions and partnerships 
From September 2003 to February 2006, Sophos served as the parent company of ActiveState, a developer of programming tools for dynamic programming languages: in February 2006, ActiveState became an independent company when it was sold to Vancouver-based venture capitalist firm Pender Financial. In 2007, Sophos acquired ENDFORCE, a company based in Ohio, United States, which developed and sold security policy compliance and Network Access Control (NAC) software. In May 2011, Sophos announced the acquisition of Astaro, a privately held provider of network security solutions, headquartered in Wilmington, Massachusetts, USA and Karlsruhe, Germany. At the time Astaro was the 4th largest UTM (Unified Threat Management) vendor and while the deal made sense at the time Forbes questioned its viability. Sophos subsequently renamed the Astaro UTM to Sophos UTM.  In November 2016, Sophos acquired Barricade, a pioneering start-up with a powerful behavior-based analytics engine built on machine learning techniques, to strengthen synchronized security capabilities and next-generation network and endpoint protection. In February 2017, Sophos acquired Invincea, a software company that provides malware threat detection, prevention, and pre-breach forensic intelligence.

In March 2020, Thoma Bravo acquired Sophos for US$3.9 billion.

See also 

 Antivirus software
 Comparison of antivirus software
 Comparison of computer viruses
 Comparison of firewalls
 Cryptography
 Identity-based security

References

External links

1985 establishments in England
British companies established in 1985
Antivirus software
English brands
Companies based in Oxfordshire
Computer security companies
Computer security software companies
Companies formerly listed on the London Stock Exchange
Security software
Software companies of England
Software companies established in 1985
Windows security software
2020 mergers and acquisitions
Private equity portfolio companies
Abingdon-on-Thames